is an important highway in the Kansai and Chūgoku regions. It connects the prefectural capitals of Kyoto, Tottori, Matsue (Shimane Prefecture), and Yamaguchi. Other significant cities along the route include Yonago, Tottori and Shimonoseki. National Route 9 also passes through parts of Hyōgo Prefecture.

Route data
Length: 
Origin: Shimogyō-ku, Kyoto (originates at junction with Routes 1, 8, 24 and 367)
Terminus: Shimonoseki (ends at junction with Route 191)
Major cities: Fukuchiyama, Tottori, Yonago, Matsue, Hamada, Yamaguchi

History
Route 9 follows the old Sanindō, an ancient highway along a similar route.
4 December 1952 - First Class National Highway 9 (from Kyoto to Shimonoseki)
1 April 1965 - General National Highway 9 (from Kyoto to Shimonoseki)

See also
Gokishichidō, the ancient highways of Japan

References

009
Roads in Hyōgo Prefecture
Roads in Kyoto Prefecture
Roads in Shimane Prefecture
Roads in Tottori Prefecture
Roads in Yamaguchi Prefecture